Bismuth (83Bi) has 41 known isotopes, ranging from 184Bi to 224Bi. Although bismuth-209 is now known to be radioactive, it has classically been considered to be a stable isotope because it has a half-life of approximately 2.01×1019 years, which is more than a billion times the age of the universe. Besides 209Bi, the most stable bismuth radioisotopes are 210mBi with a half-life of 3.04 million years, 208Bi with a half-life of 368,000 years and 207Bi, with a half-life of 32.9 years, none of which occurs in nature. All other isotopes have half-lives under 1 year, most under a day. Of naturally occurring radioisotopes, the most stable is radiogenic 210Bi with a half-life of 5.012 days. 210mBi is unusual for being a nuclear isomer with a half-life multiple orders of magnitude longer than that of the ground state.

List of isotopes 

|-
| 184Bi
|
| style="text-align:right" | 83
| style="text-align:right" | 101
| 184.00112(14)#
| 6.6(15) ms
|
|
| 3+#
|
|
|-
| style="text-indent:1em" | 184mBi
|
| colspan="3" style="text-indent:2em" | 150(100)# keV
| 13(2) ms
|
|
| 10−#
|
|
|-
| rowspan=2|185Bi
| rowspan=2|
| rowspan=2 style="text-align:right" | 83
| rowspan=2 style="text-align:right" | 102
| rowspan=2|184.99763(6)#
| rowspan=2|2# ms
| p
| 184Pb
| rowspan=2|9/2−#
| rowspan=2|
| rowspan=2|
|-
| α (rare)
| 181Tl
|-
| rowspan=2 style="text-indent:1em" | 185mBi
| rowspan=2|
| rowspan=2 colspan="3" style="text-indent:2em" | 70(50)# keV
| rowspan=2|49(7) μs
| α
| 181Tl
| rowspan=2|1/2+
| rowspan=2|
| rowspan=2|
|-
| p
| 184Pb
|-
| rowspan=2|186Bi
| rowspan=2|
| rowspan=2 style="text-align:right" | 83
| rowspan=2 style="text-align:right" | 103
| rowspan=2|185.99660(8)
| rowspan=2|14.8(7) ms
| α
| 182Tl
| rowspan=2|(3+)
| rowspan=2|
| rowspan=2|
|-
| β+ (rare)
| 186Pb
|-
| rowspan=2 style="text-indent:1em" | 186mBi
| rowspan=2|
| rowspan=2 colspan="3" style="text-indent:2em" | 270(140)# keV
| rowspan=2|9.8(4) ms
| α
| 182Tl
| rowspan=2|(10−)
| rowspan=2|
| rowspan=2|
|-
| β+
| 186Pb
|-
| rowspan=2|187Bi
| rowspan=2|
| rowspan=2 style="text-align:right" | 83
| rowspan=2 style="text-align:right" | 104
| rowspan=2|186.993158(16)
| rowspan=2|32(3) ms
| α (50%)
| 183Tl
| rowspan=2|9/2−#
| rowspan=2|
| rowspan=2|
|-
| β+ (50%)
| 187Pb
|-
| style="text-indent:1em" | 187m1Bi
|
| colspan="3" style="text-indent:2em" | 101(20) keV
| 320(70) μs
|
|
| 1/2+#
|
|
|-
| style="text-indent:1em" | 187m2Bi
|
| colspan="3" style="text-indent:2em" | 252(1) keV
| 7(5) μs
|
|
| (13/2+)
|
|
|-
| rowspan=2|188Bi
| rowspan=2|
| rowspan=2 style="text-align:right" | 83
| rowspan=2 style="text-align:right" | 105
| rowspan=2|187.99227(5)
| rowspan=2|44(3) ms
| α
| 184Tl
| rowspan=2|3+#
| rowspan=2|
| rowspan=2|
|-
| β+ (rare)
| 188Pb
|-
| rowspan=2 style="text-indent:1em" | 188mBi
| rowspan=2|
| rowspan=2 colspan="3" style="text-indent:2em" | 210(140)# keV
| rowspan=2|220(40) ms
| α
| 184Tl
| rowspan=2|(10−)
| rowspan=2|
| rowspan=2|
|-
| β+ (rare)
| 188Pb
|-
| rowspan=2|189Bi
| rowspan=2|
| rowspan=2 style="text-align:right" | 83
| rowspan=2 style="text-align:right" | 106
| rowspan=2|188.98920(6)
| rowspan=2|674(11) ms
| α (51%)
| 185Tl
| rowspan=2|(9/2−)
| rowspan=2|
| rowspan=2|
|-
| β+ (49%)
| 189Pb
|-
| style="text-indent:1em" | 189m1Bi
|
| colspan="3" style="text-indent:2em" | 181(6) keV
| 5.0(1) ms
|
|
| (1/2+)
|
|
|-
| style="text-indent:1em" | 189m2Bi
|
| colspan="3" style="text-indent:2em" | 357(1) keV
| 880(50) ns
|
|
| (13/2+)
|
|
|-
| rowspan=2|190Bi
| rowspan=2|
| rowspan=2 style="text-align:right" | 83
| rowspan=2 style="text-align:right" | 107
| rowspan=2|189.9883(2)
| rowspan=2|6.3(1) s
| α (77%)
| 186Tl
| rowspan=2|(3+)
| rowspan=2|
| rowspan=2|
|-
| β+ (30%)
| 190Pb
|-
| rowspan=2 style="text-indent:1em" | 190m1Bi
| rowspan=2|
| rowspan=2 colspan="3" style="text-indent:2em" | 420(180) keV
| rowspan=2|6.2(1) s
| α (70%)
| 186Tl
| rowspan=2|(10−)
| rowspan=2|
| rowspan=2|
|-
| β+ (23%)
| 190Pb
|-
| style="text-indent:1em" | 190m2Bi
|
| colspan="3" style="text-indent:2em" | 690(180) keV
| >500(100) ns
|
|
| 7+#
|
|
|-
| rowspan=2|191Bi
| rowspan=2|
| rowspan=2 style="text-align:right" | 83
| rowspan=2 style="text-align:right" | 108
| rowspan=2|190.985786(8)
| rowspan=2|12.3(3) s
| α (60%)
| 187Tl
| rowspan=2|(9/2−)
| rowspan=2|
| rowspan=2|
|-
| β+ (40%)
| 191Pb
|-
| rowspan=2 style="text-indent:1em" | 191mBi
| rowspan=2|
| rowspan=2 colspan="3" style="text-indent:2em" | 240(4) keV
| rowspan=2|124(5) ms
| α (75%)
| 187Tl
| rowspan=2|(1/2+)
| rowspan=2|
| rowspan=2|
|-
| β+ (25%)
| 191Pb
|-
| rowspan=2|192Bi
| rowspan=2|
| rowspan=2 style="text-align:right" | 83
| rowspan=2 style="text-align:right" | 109
| rowspan=2|191.98546(4)
| rowspan=2|34.6(9) s
| β+ (82%)
| 192Pb
| rowspan=2|(3+)
| rowspan=2|
| rowspan=2|
|-
| α (18%)
| 188Tl
|-
| rowspan=2 style="text-indent:1em" | 192mBi
| rowspan=2|
| rowspan=2 colspan="3" style="text-indent:2em" | 150(30) keV
| rowspan=2|39.6(4) s
| β+ (90.8%)
| 192Pb
| rowspan=2|(10−)
| rowspan=2|
| rowspan=2|
|-
| α (9.2%)
| 188Tl
|-
| rowspan=2|193Bi
| rowspan=2|
| rowspan=2 style="text-align:right" | 83
| rowspan=2 style="text-align:right" | 110
| rowspan=2|192.98296(1)
| rowspan=2|67(3) s
| β+ (95%)
| 193Pb
| rowspan=2|(9/2−)
| rowspan=2|
| rowspan=2|
|-
| α (5%)
| 189Tl
|-
| rowspan=2 style="text-indent:1em" | 193mBi
| rowspan=2|
| rowspan=2 colspan="3" style="text-indent:2em" | 308(7) keV
| rowspan=2|3.2(6) s
| α (90%)
| 189Tl
| rowspan=2|(1/2+)
| rowspan=2|
| rowspan=2|
|-
| β+ (10%)
| 193Pb
|-
| rowspan=2|194Bi
| rowspan=2|
| rowspan=2 style="text-align:right" | 83
| rowspan=2 style="text-align:right" | 111
| rowspan=2|193.98283(5)
| rowspan=2|95(3) s
| β+ (99.54%)
| 194Pb
| rowspan=2|(3+)
| rowspan=2|
| rowspan=2|
|-
| α (.46%)
| 190Tl
|-
| rowspan=2 style="text-indent:1em" | 194m1Bi
| rowspan=2|
| rowspan=2 colspan="3" style="text-indent:2em" | 110(70) keV
| rowspan=2|125(2) s
| β+
| 194Pb
| rowspan=2|(6+, 7+)
| rowspan=2|
| rowspan=2|
|-
| α (rare)
| 190Tl
|-
| style="text-indent:1em" | 194m2Bi
|
| colspan="3" style="text-indent:2em" | 230(90)# keV
| 115(4) s
|
|
| (10−)
|
|
|-
| rowspan=2|195Bi
| rowspan=2|
| rowspan=2 style="text-align:right" | 83
| rowspan=2 style="text-align:right" | 112
| rowspan=2|194.980651(6)
| rowspan=2|183(4) s
| β+ (99.97%)
| 195Pb
| rowspan=2|(9/2−)
| rowspan=2|
| rowspan=2|
|-
| α (.03%)
| 191Tl
|-
| rowspan=2 style="text-indent:1em" | 195m1Bi
| rowspan=2|
| rowspan=2 colspan="3" style="text-indent:2em" | 399(6) keV
| rowspan=2|87(1) s
| β+ (67%)
| 195Pb
| rowspan=2|(1/2+)
| rowspan=2|
| rowspan=2|
|-
| α (33%)
| 191Tl
|-
| style="text-indent:1em" | 195m2Bi
|
| colspan="3" style="text-indent:2em" | 2311.4+X keV
| 750(50) ns
|
|
| (29/2−)
|
|
|-
| rowspan=2|196Bi
| rowspan=2|
| rowspan=2 style="text-align:right" | 83
| rowspan=2 style="text-align:right" | 113
| rowspan=2|195.980667(26)
| rowspan=2|5.1(2) min
| β+ (99.99%)
| 196Pb
| rowspan=2|(3+)
| rowspan=2|
| rowspan=2|
|-
| α (.00115%)
| 192Tl
|-
| rowspan=2 style="text-indent:1em" | 196m1Bi
| rowspan=2|
| rowspan=2 colspan="3" style="text-indent:2em" | 166.6(30) keV
| rowspan=2|0.6(5) s
| IT
| 196Bi
| rowspan=2|(7+)
| rowspan=2|
| rowspan=2|
|-
| β+
| 196Pb
|-
| style="text-indent:1em" | 196m2Bi
|
| colspan="3" style="text-indent:2em" | 270(3) keV
| 4.00(5) min
|
|
| (10−)
|
|
|-
| rowspan=2|197Bi
| rowspan=2|
| rowspan=2 style="text-align:right" | 83
| rowspan=2 style="text-align:right" | 114
| rowspan=2|196.978864(9)
| rowspan=2|9.33(50) min
| β+ (99.99%)
| 197Pb
| rowspan=2|(9/2−)
| rowspan=2|
| rowspan=2|
|-
| α (10−4%)
| 193Tl
|-
| rowspan=3 style="text-indent:1em" | 197m1Bi
| rowspan=3|
| rowspan=3 colspan="3" style="text-indent:2em" | 690(110) keV
| rowspan=3|5.04(16) min
| α (55%)
| 193Tl
| rowspan=3|(1/2+)
| rowspan=3|
| rowspan=3|
|-
| β+ (45%)
| 197Pb
|-
| IT (.3%)
| 197Bi
|-
| style="text-indent:1em" | 197m2Bi
|
| colspan="3" style="text-indent:2em" | 2129.3(4) keV
| 204(18) ns
|
|
| (23/2−)
|
|
|-
| style="text-indent:1em" | 197m3Bi
|
| colspan="3" style="text-indent:2em" | 2360.4(5)+X keV
| 263(13) ns
|
|
| (29/2−)
|
|
|-
| style="text-indent:1em" | 197m4Bi
|
| colspan="3" style="text-indent:2em" | 2383.1(7)+X keV
| 253(39) ns
|
|
| (29/2−)
|
|
|-
| style="text-indent:1em" | 197m5Bi
|
| colspan="3" style="text-indent:2em" | 2929.5(5) keV
| 209(30) ns
|
|
| (31/2−)
|
|
|-
| 198Bi
|
| style="text-align:right" | 83
| style="text-align:right" | 115
| 197.97921(3)
| 10.3(3) min
| β+
| 198Pb
| (2+, 3+)
|
|
|-
| style="text-indent:1em" | 198m1Bi
|
| colspan="3" style="text-indent:2em" | 280(40) keV
| 11.6(3) min
| β+
| 198Pb
| (7+)
|
|
|-
| style="text-indent:1em" | 198m2Bi
|
| colspan="3" style="text-indent:2em" | 530(40) keV
| 7.7(5) s
|
|
| 10−
|
|
|-
| 199Bi
|
| style="text-align:right" | 83
| style="text-align:right" | 116
| 198.977672(13)
| 27(1) min
| β+
| 199Pb
| 9/2−
|
|
|-
| rowspan=3 style="text-indent:1em" | 199m1Bi
| rowspan=3|
| rowspan=3 colspan="3" style="text-indent:2em" | 667(4) keV
| rowspan=3|24.70(15) min
| β+ (98%)
| 199Pb
| rowspan=3|(1/2+)
| rowspan=3|
| rowspan=3|
|-
| IT (2%)
| 199Bi
|-
| α (.01%)
| 195Tl
|-
| style="text-indent:1em" | 199m2Bi
|
| colspan="3" style="text-indent:2em" | 1947(25) keV
| 0.10(3) μs
|
|
| (25/2+)
|
|
|-
| style="text-indent:1em" | 199m3Bi
|
| colspan="3" style="text-indent:2em" | ~2547.0 keV
| 168(13) ns
|
|
| 29/2−
|
|
|-
| 200Bi
|
| style="text-align:right" | 83
| style="text-align:right" | 117
| 199.978132(26)
| 36.4(5) min
| β+
| 200Pb
| 7+
|
|
|-
| rowspan=2 style="text-indent:1em" | 200m1Bi
| rowspan=2|
| rowspan=2 colspan="3" style="text-indent:2em" | 100(70)# keV
| rowspan=2|31(2) min
| EC (90%)
| 200Pb
| rowspan=2|(2+)
| rowspan=2|
| rowspan=2|
|-
| IT (10%)
| 200Bi
|-
| style="text-indent:1em" | 200m2Bi
|
| colspan="3" style="text-indent:2em" | 428.20(10) keV
| 400(50) ms
|
|
| (10−)
|
|
|-
| rowspan=2|201Bi
| rowspan=2|
| rowspan=2 style="text-align:right" | 83
| rowspan=2 style="text-align:right" | 118
| rowspan=2|200.977009(16)
| rowspan=2|108(3) min
| β+ (99.99%)
| 201Pb
| rowspan=2|9/2−
| rowspan=2|
| rowspan=2|
|-
| α (10−4%)
| 197Tl
|-
| rowspan=3 style="text-indent:1em" | 201m1Bi
| rowspan=3|
| rowspan=3 colspan="3" style="text-indent:2em" | 846.34(21) keV
| rowspan=3|59.1(6) min
| EC (92.9%)
| 201Pb
| rowspan=3|1/2+
| rowspan=3|
| rowspan=3|
|-
| IT (6.8%)
| 201Bi
|-
| α (.3%)
| 197Tl
|-
| style="text-indent:1em" | 201m2Bi
|
| colspan="3" style="text-indent:2em" | 1932.2+X keV
| 118(28) ns
|
|
| (25/2+)
|
|
|-
| style="text-indent:1em" | 201m3Bi
|
| colspan="3" style="text-indent:2em" | 1971.2+X keV
| 105(75) ns
|
|
| (27/2+)
|
|
|-
| style="text-indent:1em" | 201m4Bi
|
| colspan="3" style="text-indent:2em" | 2739.90(20)+X keV
| 124(4) ns
|
|
| (29/2−)
|
|
|-
| rowspan=2|202Bi
| rowspan=2|
| rowspan=2 style="text-align:right" | 83
| rowspan=2 style="text-align:right" | 119
| rowspan=2|201.977742(22)
| rowspan=2|1.72(5) h
| β+
| 202Pb
| rowspan=2|5(+#)
| rowspan=2|
| rowspan=2|
|-
| α (10−5%)
| 198Tl
|-
| style="text-indent:1em" | 202m1Bi
|
| colspan="3" style="text-indent:2em" | 615(7) keV
| 3.04(6) μs
|
|
| (10#)−
|
|
|-
| style="text-indent:1em" | 202m2Bi
|
| colspan="3" style="text-indent:2em" | 2607.1(5) keV
| 310(50) ns
|
|
| (17+)
|
|
|-
| rowspan=2|203Bi
| rowspan=2|
| rowspan=2 style="text-align:right" | 83
| rowspan=2 style="text-align:right" | 120
| rowspan=2|202.976876(23)
| rowspan=2|11.76(5) h
| β+
| 203Pb
| rowspan=2|9/2−
| rowspan=2|
| rowspan=2|
|-
| α (10−5%)
| 199Tl
|-
| style="text-indent:1em" | 203m1Bi
|
| colspan="3" style="text-indent:2em" | 1098.14(7) keV
| 303(5) ms
| IT
| 203Bi
| 1/2+
|
|
|-
| style="text-indent:1em" | 203m2Bi
|
| colspan="3" style="text-indent:2em" | 2041.5(6) keV
| 194(30) ns
|
|
| 25/2+
|
|
|-
| 204Bi
|
| style="text-align:right" | 83
| style="text-align:right" | 121
| 203.977813(28)
| 11.22(10) h
| β+
| 204Pb
| 6+
|
|
|-
| style="text-indent:1em" | 204m1Bi
|
| colspan="3" style="text-indent:2em" | 805.5(3) keV
| 13.0(1) ms
| IT
| 204Bi
| 10−
|
|
|-
| style="text-indent:1em" | 204m2Bi
|
| colspan="3" style="text-indent:2em" | 2833.4(11) keV
| 1.07(3) ms
|
|
| (17+)
|
|
|-
| 205Bi
|
| style="text-align:right" | 83
| style="text-align:right" | 122
| 204.977389(8)
| 15.31(4) d
| β+
| 205Pb
| 9/2−
|
|
|-
| 206Bi
|
| style="text-align:right" | 83
| style="text-align:right" | 123
| 205.978499(8)
| 6.243(3) d
| β+
| 206Pb
| 6(+)
|
|
|-
| style="text-indent:1em" | 206m1Bi
|
| colspan="3" style="text-indent:2em" | 59.897(17) keV
| 7.7(2) μs
|
|
| (4+)
|
|
|-
| style="text-indent:1em" | 206m2Bi
|
| colspan="3" style="text-indent:2em" | 1044.8(5) keV
| 890(10) μs
|
|
| (10−)
|
|
|-
| 207Bi
|
| style="text-align:right" | 83
| style="text-align:right" | 124
| 206.9784707(26)
| 32.9(14) y
| β+
| 207Pb
| 9/2−
|
|
|-
| style="text-indent:1em" | 207mBi
|
| colspan="3" style="text-indent:2em" | 2101.49(16) keV
| 182(6) μs
|
|
| 21/2+
|
|
|-
| 208Bi
|
| style="text-align:right" | 83
| style="text-align:right" | 125
| 207.9797422(25)
| 3.68(4)×105 y
| β+
| 208Pb
| (5)+
|
|
|-
| style="text-indent:1em" | 208mBi
|
| colspan="3" style="text-indent:2em" | 1571.1(4) keV
| 2.58(4) ms
| IT
| 208Bi
| (10)−
|
|
|-
| 209Bi
|
| style="text-align:right" | 83
| style="text-align:right" | 126
| 208.9803987(16)
| 2.01(8)×1019 y
| α
| 205Tl
| 9/2−
| 1.0000
|
|-
| rowspan=2|210Bi
| rowspan=2|Radium E
| rowspan=2 style="text-align:right" | 83
| rowspan=2 style="text-align:right" | 127
| rowspan=2|209.9841204(16)
| rowspan=2|5.012(5) d
| β−
| 210Po
| rowspan=2|1−
| rowspan=2|Trace
| rowspan=2|
|-
| α (1.32×10−4%)
| 206Tl
|-
| style="text-indent:1em" | 210mBi
|
| colspan="3" style="text-indent:2em" | 271.31(11) keV
| 3.04(6)×106 y
| α
| 206Tl
| 9−
|
|
|-
| rowspan=2|211Bi
| rowspan=2|Actinium C
| rowspan=2 style="text-align:right" | 83
| rowspan=2 style="text-align:right" | 128
| rowspan=2|210.987269(6)
| rowspan=2|2.14(2) min
| α (99.72%)
| 207Tl
| rowspan=2|9/2−
| rowspan=2|Trace
| rowspan=2|
|-
| β− (.276%)
| 211Po
|-
| style="text-indent:1em" | 211mBi
|
| colspan="3" style="text-indent:2em" | 1257(10) keV
| 1.4(3) μs
|
|
| (25/2−)
|
|
|-
| rowspan=3|212Bi
| rowspan=3|Thorium C
| rowspan=3 style="text-align:right" | 83
| rowspan=3 style="text-align:right" | 129
| rowspan=3|211.9912857(21)
| rowspan=3|60.55(6) min
| β− (64.05%)
| 212Po
| rowspan=3|1(−)
| rowspan=3|Trace
| rowspan=3|
|-
| α (35.94%)
| 208Tl
|-
| β−, α (.014%)
| 208Pb
|-
| rowspan=3 style="text-indent:1em" | 212m1Bi
| rowspan=3|
| rowspan=3 colspan="3" style="text-indent:2em" | 250(30) keV
| rowspan=3|25.0(2) min
| α (67%)
| 208Tl
| rowspan=3|(9−)
| rowspan=3|
| rowspan=3|
|-
| β− (33%)
| 212mPo
|-
| β−, α (.3%)
| 208Pb
|-
| style="text-indent:1em" | 212m2Bi
|
| colspan="3" style="text-indent:2em" | 2200(200)# keV
| 7.0(3) min
|
|
| >16
|
|
|-
| rowspan=2|213Bi
| rowspan=2|
| rowspan=2 style="text-align:right" | 83
| rowspan=2 style="text-align:right" | 130
| rowspan=2|212.994385(5)
| rowspan=2|45.59(6) min
| β− (97.91%)
| 213Po
| rowspan=2|9/2−
| rowspan=2|Trace
| rowspan=2|
|-
| α (2.09%)
| 209Tl
|-
| rowspan=3|214Bi
| rowspan=3|Radium C
| rowspan=3 style="text-align:right" | 83
| rowspan=3 style="text-align:right" | 131
| rowspan=3|213.998712(12)
| rowspan=3|19.9(4) min
| β− (99.97%)
| 214Po
| rowspan=3|1−
| rowspan=3|Trace
| rowspan=3|
|-
| α (.021%)
| 210Tl
|-
| β−, α (.003%)
| 210Pb
|-
| 215Bi
|
| style="text-align:right" | 83
| style="text-align:right" | 132
| 215.001770(16)
| 7.6(2) min
| β−
| 215Po
| (9/2−)
| Trace
|
|-
| rowspan=2 style="text-indent:1em" | 215mBi
| rowspan=2| 
| rowspan=2 colspan="3" style="text-indent:2em" | 1347.5(25) keV
| rowspan=2| 36.9(6) s
| IT (76.9%)
| 215Bi
| rowspan=2| (25/2−)
| rowspan=2| 
| rowspan=2| 
|-
| β− (23.1%)
| 215Po
|-
| 216Bi
|
| style="text-align:right" | 83
| style="text-align:right" | 133
| 216.006306(12)
| 2.17(5) min
| β−
| 216Po
| (6-, 7-)
|
|
|-
| style="text-indent:1em" | 216mBi
|
| colspan="3" style="text-indent:2em" | 24(19) keV
| 6.6(21) min
| β−
| 216Po
| 3-#
|
|
|-
| 217Bi
|
| style="text-align:right" | 83
| style="text-align:right" | 134
| 217.009372(19)
| 98.5(8) s
| β−
| 217Po
| 9/2−#
|
|
|-
| style="text-indent:1em" | 217mBi
|
| colspan="3" style="text-indent:2em" | 1480(40) keV
| 2.70(6) μs
| IT
| 217Bi
| 25/2−#
|
|
|-
| 218Bi
|
| style="text-align:right" | 83
| style="text-align:right" | 135
| 218.014188(29)
| 33(1) s
| β−
| 218Po
| (6-, 7-, 8-)
|
|
|-
| 219Bi
|
| style="text-align:right" | 83
| style="text-align:right" | 136
| 219.017480(210)#
| 8.7(29) s
| β−
| 219Po
| 9/2-#
|
|
|-
| 220Bi
|
| style="text-align:right" | 83
| style="text-align:right" | 137
| 220.022350(320)#
| 9.5(57) s
| β−
| 220Po
| 1-#
|
|

Bismuth-213 
Bismuth-213 (213Bi) has a half-life of 45 minutes and decays via alpha emission. Commercially, bismuth-213 can be produced by bombarding radium with bremsstrahlung photons from a linear particle accelerator, which populates its progenitor actinium-225. In 1997, an antibody conjugate with 213Bi  was used to treat patients with leukemia. This isotope has also been tried in targeted alpha therapy (TAT) program to treat a variety of cancers. Bismuth-213 is also found in the decay chain of uranium-233, which is the fuel bred by thorium reactors.

References 

 Isotope masses from:

 Isotopic compositions and standard atomic masses from:

 Half-life, spin, and isomer data selected from the following sources.

 
Bismuth
Bismuth